USNS Sioux (T-ATF-171) was a United States Navy  in service from 1981 to 2021.

Sioux was laid down on 22 March 1979 by the Marinette Marine Corporation at Marinette, Wisconsin. Launched on 15 November 1980 and delivered to the U.S. Navy on 1 May 1981, Sioux was assigned to the Pacific Fleet of Military Sealift Command (MSC), and placed in non-commissioned service as USNS Sioux (T-ATF-171) in 1981. Although stationed primarily at San Diego, California, Sioux frequently operates from Pearl Harbor, Hawaii, San Francisco, California and Bremerton, Washington.

She was inactivated on 30 September 2021

Service history
In 2014, Sioux came to the aid of the damaged Royal Canadian Navy vessel  which had caught fire off Hawaii. The tug brought the damaged ship into Pearl Harbor safely. For that mission, Sioux was awarded a Canadian Forces Unit Commendation in June 2015.

References

External links

 NavSource Online: Service Ship Photo Archive: USNS Sioux (T-ATF-171)

 

Tugs of the United States Navy
Cold War auxiliary ships of the United States
Ships built by Marinette Marine
1980 ships